The Tanawha Trail, stretching  from Julian Price Park to Beacon Heights parallels the Blue Ridge Parkway on Grandfather Mountain in North Carolina, in the United States.  Tanawha, the Cherokee word for fabulous hawk or eagle is an appropriate name for this trail that offers hikers views of distant mountains.  Completed in 1993, the Tanawha Trail, like the final section of the Parkway it mirrors, is unique in construction.  The trail traverses a fragile and ancient ecosystem and leads hikers through a surprising range of biological and geological terrains.  Some sections tunnel through thickets of laurel and rhododendron.  Others dip down into remote hardwood coves and then ascend into evergreen glens.  Boulder fields and cascading streams punctuate the landscape.

Sections above the Linn Cove Viaduct and along Rough Ridge are strenuous, but overall the trail is an easy to moderate walk.  The many accesses from the Parkway let hikers choose as long a section as they like.  To preserve this delicate area, hikers are encouraged to stay on designated paths, bridges, and boardwalks.

Most of the Tanawha Trail is also incorporated as a part of North Carolina's Mountains-to-Sea Trail (MST), which transverses the state from the Great Smoky Mountains to the Outer Banks.

History
The Tanawha Trail was completed in 1993, and was explicitly designed to be hiked.

Navigation
Throughout its length, the Tanawha Trail is blazed with a hawk feather printed on small, metal signs.  Most of these signs also display the Mountains-to-Sea Trail's white dot, where the two trails are combined.  Junctions with side and connecting trails are signed; however, the other trails might not be blazed.

Camping
Camping is not permitted on the Tanawha Trail; however, many backpacking opportunities do exist.  The north-eastern trail-head is within Price Park's campground, which is open from May to October.  The south-western trail-head is close to the Pisgah National Forest, which allows dispersed camping along the MST.  The Tanawha Trail also provides the principle access to Grandfather Mountain State Park's eastern trails, which have designated, primitive campsites.

Route
The south-western trail-head is at the parkway's Beacon Heights Overlook.  Shortly past the overlook, the MST joins with the Tanawha Trail, after it ascended Beacon Heights from the Pisgah National Forest.  From there, the combined trails follow wooded lands alongside the Blue Ridge Parkway to the Linn Cove Visitor Center.

From the visitor center, the Tanawha Trail passes underneath the Linn Cove Viaduct and ascends steeply up stone steps past an enormous boulder wall.  The trail levels off and enters a shady glen thick with birch and beech trees.  Beyond the cascading water of Wilson Creek, the trail crosses a clearing filled with huge rock formations.  The trail here, accented with flat rocks, is like a flagstone path.

Here the view into the Piedmont is unobstructed because of the unusual low-growing and fragile mountain-heather ecosystems. It also offers an outstanding glimpse of the Linn Cove Viaduct and several mountains, Grandmother Mountain, Hawksbill and Table Rock.

The trail continues on through a stately spruce and hemlock forest into a wooded glen reminiscent of New England.  Its rocky landscape is filled with poplars, yellow birch, and oak.

Past Raven Rock, the trail tunnels through mountain laurel and rhododendron.  This sheltered section then gives way to a more open area with a rock garden where large ferns cascade out of immense boulders.

More thickets of rhododendron lead to the junction of the Daniel Boone Scout Trail, one of Grandfather Mountain State Park's many trails.  Not much further away, is the junction with Nuwati Trail, another state park trail.  Hiking or camping on Grandfather Mountain requires a permit.

The Tanawha Trail passes several small cascades and crosses Boone Fork Creek.  Around the creek are junctions with the Asutsi Trail and the Upper Boone Fork Trail.  Also, a self-registration, permit box for Grandfather Mountain is located near the Asutsi Trail junction.  The trail winds in and out of rhododendron and laurel thickets, joins with an old logging road, and passes through a hardwood forest.

In the last section leading to Price Park, the trail breaks out of the woods into open fields.  Here, it parallels and crosses Holloway Mountain Road, passes apple orchards, an old grave site, and pasture land, which in spring, is blanketed with numerous wild-flowers. The pasture land is active, and features cattle which are not separated from hikers. Although docile and avoidant of humans, there have been incidents where injuries have resulted from conflicts with livestock, and signs along the trail entrance near this area warn of the cattle and what to do around them. They may typically be seen grazing or resting in the shade provided by mountain laurel plants. in Finally, the trail briefly joins the Boone Fork Trail and departs with the MST, before ending with a short walk into Price Park's campground.

See also
 Blue Ridge Parkway
 Grandfather Mountain State Park
 Julian Price Memorial Park
 Linn Cove Viaduct
 Mountains-to-Sea Trail

References

External links
 
 Friends of the Mountains to Sea Trail

Blue Ridge Parkway
Hiking trails in North Carolina
Protected areas of Watauga County, North Carolina
Protected areas of Avery County, North Carolina